The 1958–59 Copa México was the 42nd edition of the Copa México and the 16th staging in the professional era.

The competition started on March 15, 1959, and concluded on April 26, 1959, with the Final, held at the Estadio Olímpico de la Ciudad de los Deportes in Mexico City, in which Zacatepec defeated León 1–0, a replay of the 1957–58 tournament final.

Preliminary round

|}

Final round

Final

References

Copa MX
1958–59 in Mexican football
1959 domestic association football cups